Ragna Schirmer (born 1972) is a German classical pianist.

Life 
Born in Hildesheim, from 1991 Schirmer studied with Karl-Heinz Kämmerling at the Hochschule für Musik und Theater Hannover. From 1993, she continued her studies in Paris with Bernard Ringeissen. In 1995 she completed her studies with a diploma (with top marks), and in 1999 she completed her soloist training with a concert exam. Since then she has taken part in several master classes. From 2001 to 2011 Ragna Schirmer was professor of piano at the Hochschule für Musik und Darstellende Kunst Mannheim and today promotes young talents in Halle.

Schirmer received a scholarship from both Deutscher Musikrat and the Studienstiftung des Deutschen Volkes. She is the only pianist to have won the International Johann Sebastian Bach Competition in Leipzig twice, in 1992 and 1998. As her first CD, she released a recording of Bach's Goldberg Variations in 2000. This and other CDs have received awards in professional music journals. She was artist in residence in Heidelberg in 2010. In 2012 she was honoured with the Handel Prize of Halle, and in 2019 she received – together with the musicologist Janina Klassen – the Robert Schumann Prize of the City of Zwickau.

References

External links 
 
 
 
 
 Ragna Schirmers Homepage

1972 births
Living people
People from Hildesheim
Women classical pianists
German classical pianists
21st-century classical pianists
21st-century German musicians
Handel Prize winners
21st-century women pianists